Joshua James Guppey (August 27, 1820December 8, 1893) was an American lawyer, politician, and Wisconsin pioneer.  He served as a Union Army officer in the American Civil War, and received an honorary brevet to the rank of brigadier general.

Biography
Guppey was born on August 27, 1820 in Dover, New Hampshire. He was a descendant of Joshua Guppey, who emigrated from England in 1720.

Guppey graduated from Dartmouth College in 1843. Guppey moved to Columbus, Wisconsin, in 1846 and opened a law practice before moving to Portage, Wisconsin in 1849. Guppey died of influenza and pneumonia in Portage on December 8, 1893 and is interred at Pine Hill Cemetery (Dover, New Hampshire).

Military career
Guppey was commissioned an officer in the Union Army in 1861 and was assigned to the 10th Wisconsin Infantry Regiment. In 1862, he was promoted to Colonel and assumed command of the 23rd Wisconsin Infantry Regiment at Camp Randall. The regiment, with Guppey in command, later took part in the Battle of Fort Hindman and the Battle of Champion Hill. His second-in-command during the Battle of Champion Hill was future U.S. Postmaster General and Secretary of Interior William Freeman Vilas. Guppey later contracted malaria and was shot below his left knee in 1863 in the Battle of Bayou Bourbeux, which incapacitated him for a time. Afterward, he took part in the Red River Campaign. In 1865, he participated in the Battle of Fort Blakely. Guppey was mustered out of the volunteers on July 4, 1865. On January 13, 1866, President Andrew Johnson nominated Guppey for appointment to the grade of brevet brigadier general of volunteers to rank from March 13, 1865, and the United States Senate confirmed the appointment on March 12, 1866. After the war, Guppey was active in the Wisconsin Army National Guard until retiring in 1893.

Political career
Guppey became a probate judge in Columbia County, Wisconsin, in 1849. The following year, he was named a county judge and remained one until 1858. From 1858 to 1861 and again from 1866 to 1873, he was superintendent of Portage schools. In 1862, Guppey was the Democratic candidate for the United States House of Representatives from Wisconsin's 2nd congressional district. He lost to Ithamar Sloan. After the election, he changed his affiliation to the Republican Party.

References

|-

People from Dover, New Hampshire
People from Portage, Wisconsin
People of Wisconsin in the American Civil War
Union Army generals
Wisconsin Democrats
Wisconsin Republicans
Wisconsin lawyers
Educators from Wisconsin
Wisconsin state court judges
Dartmouth College alumni
1820 births
1893 deaths
People from Columbus, Wisconsin
19th-century American judges
19th-century American lawyers
19th-century American educators